"Tears" is Fayray's 7th single. It was released on July 26, 2000 and peaked at #11 in the charts. The song was used as the theme song for the TBS drama "Friends".  "Tears" is Fayray's best selling single to date.

Track listing
tears
If, I
tears -piano version-

Charts 
"tears" - Oricon Sales Chart (Japan)

External links
FAYRAY OFFICIAL SITE

2000 singles
Fayray songs
2000 songs
Songs written by Fayray